Obuz is a village in the Elazığ District of Elazığ Province in Turkey. Its population is 90 (2021).

References

Villages in Elazığ District